Neal Israel (born July 27, 1945) is an American actor, screenwriter, film and television producer, and director best known for his comedic work in the 1980s for films such as Police Academy, Real Genius, and Bachelor Party.

Biography

Career
Raised in Manhattan in a Jewish family, Israel started his career on the Broadway stage as assistant to legendary director George Abbott. After working at the New Dramatists Guild and the Eugene O'Neill Playwrights Conference, he came to Los Angeles, and was an executive at both ABC and CBS. During this time he wrote and directed the break through indie hit Tunnel Vision, which introduced such future stars as Chevy Chase, John Candy and Al Franken.

On television, he wrote Ringo, a special that starred Ringo Starr and George Harrison. He then wrote with his partner, Pat Proft, the first Police Academy movie, which spawned six sequels. He directed and co-wrote Bachelor Party, which starred Tom Hanks. He followed this with the comedy Moving Violations. Real Genius, another of his scripts, was made into a successful film starring Val Kilmer, and in 1987, he produced the film Three O'Clock High. He also directed Breaking The Rules starring Jason Bateman and the cult classic Surf Ninjas with Rob Schneider and Leslie Nielsen.

Neal continues to work in both film and television as a writer, director, producer, and script doctor. He has directed numerous movies of the week, pilots, and episodes of shows such as The Wonder Years, Nash Bridges, Joan of Arcadia, and Even Stevens. Recent directing credits include Disney's Zeke and Luther and Kickin It. In 2004, he executive-produced the Academy Award-nominated film Finding Neverland, which starred Johnny Depp and Kate Winslet.

In July 2017, Israel said he was working on a comedy with his longterm partner Pat Proft that will feature stars of the predominant comedic films of the '70s and '80s.

Personal life
His first marriage was to American singer/songwriter Lori Lieberman. They divorced in 1980. After being hired by director Amy Heckerling to work on Johnny Dangerously, the two began a relationship and married in July 1984. The couple divorced in 1990 after making Look Who's Talking Too together. Israel believed their daughter, Mollie, was biologically his until a DNA test showed she was the biological daughter of director Harold Ramis.

Filmography

As director

 Tunnel Vision (with Bradley R. Swirnoff) (1976)
 Americathon (1979)
 Bachelor Party (1984)
 Moving Violations (1985)
 The George Burns Comedy Week (1985) (TV)
 Combat Academy (1986) (TV)
 The Cover Girl and the Cop (1989) (TV)
 The Wonder Years (1991) (TV)
 Breaking the Rules (1992) (aka Sketches)
 Surf Ninjas (1993)
 Harts of the West (1994) (TV)
 Family Reunion: A Relative Nightmare (1995) (TV)
 Dad's Week Off (1997) (TV)
 Love Boat: The Next Wave (1999) (TV)
 Clueless (1997–1999) (TV)
 Shasta McNasty (1999) (TV)
 Even Stevens (2000) (TV)
 Hounded (2001) (TV)
 The Poof Point (2001) (TV)
 Lizzie McGuire (2001) (TV)
 The Mind of the Married Man (2001) (TV)
 Family Affair (2002) (TV)
 The Brady Bunch in the White House (2002) (TV)
 Do Over (2002) (TV)
 National Lampoon's Thanksgiving Family Reunion (2003) (TV)
 Phil of the Future (2004) (TV)
 Joan of Arcadia (2005) (TV)
 Flight 29 Down (2007) (TV)
 About a Girl (2007) (TV)
 The Fresh Beat Band (2010) (TV)
 Zeke and Luther (2011) (TV)
 Dog with a Blog (2013) (TV)
 I Didn't Do It (2015) (TV)

As producer

 Twilight Theater (1982) (TV)
 Three O'Clock High (1987)
 Life on the Flipside (1987)
 CBS Summer Playhouse (1988) (TV)
 Dream Date (1989) (TV)
 Bonnie & Clyde: The True Story (1992)
 Taking the Heat (1993) (TV)
 Family Reunion: A Relative Nightmare (1995) (TV)
 Kidz in the Wood (1996) (TV)
 Chocolate for Breakfast (1998)
 The Runner (1999)
 Miracles (2003) (TV)
 Finding Neverland (2004)
 Bachelor Party 2: The Last Temptation (2008) (as executive producer)

As writer

 Yogi's Gang (1973) (TV)
 Tunnel Vision (with Michael Mislove) (1976)
 Cracking Up (with Phil Proctor, Peter Bergman, The Credibility Gap and The Ace Trucking Company) (1977)
 Americathon (with Phil Proctor, Peter Bergman, Michael Mislove and Monica Johnson) (1979)
 All Commercials... A Steve Martin Special (1980) (TV)
 Steve Martin's Twilight Theater (1982) (TV)
 Police Academy (with Pat Proft and Hugh Wilson) (1984)
 Bachelor Party (with Pat Proft) (1984)
 Moving Violations (with Pat Proft) (1985)
 Real Genius (with Pat Proft and Peter Torokvei) (1985)
 Look Who's Talking Too (with Amy Heckerling) (1990)
 The Adventures of Mary-Kate and Ashley: The Case of the Sea World Adventure (with Arnold Margolin) (1995) (Video Short)
 The Adventures of Mary-Kate and Ashley: The Case of the Mystery Cruise (with Arnold Margolin) (1995) (Video Short)
 Family Reunion: A Relative Nightmare (with Patrick J. Clifton) (1995) (TV)
 Kidz in the Wood (with Robert Klane) (1996) (TV)
 Dad's Week Off (1997) (TV)
 Police Academy: The Series (1997) (TV)
 The Patty Duke Show: Still Rockin' in Brooklyn Heights (1999) (TV)

As actor

 Johnny Dangerously (1984) as Dr. Zilman
 It's Alive III: Island of the Alive (1987) as Dr. Brewster
 Look Who's Talking (1989) as Mr. Ross
 Look Who's Talking Too (1990) as Mr. Ross

As special thanks

 Stunt Sport (2014) (TV)
 Patton 2015 (2015) (Short)

Awards and nominations

References

External links

1945 births
American male film actors
Film producers from California
People from Manhattan Beach, California
American male screenwriters
American male television actors
American television directors
Comedy film directors
Television producers from California
American television writers
Living people
Place of birth missing (living people)
Writers Guild of America Award winners
American male television writers
Film directors from California
Screenwriters from California